Will or William Blackwell may refer to:

 Will Blackwell (born 1975), American football wide receiver
William Blackwell (architect), Canadian architect who worked in Peterborough, Ontario
William Blackwell (captain), founder of Mortlake, Connecticut
William H. Blackwell (1882–1963), American fruit farmer and politician